Psidium galapageium, the Galápagos guava or guayabillo, is a small tree or shrub found in tropical areas, formerly endemic to the Galápagos Islands.

Description

It has wide-spreading branches with dotted grey branchlets with reddish to white or yellowish "trichomes" or hairs. The branchlets tend to become more smooth at the edges and the bark more stringy, and the terminal branchlets and leaves are sometimes covered with a scurfy reddish bloom.

Its leaves are opposite and elliptic to ovate, with the tips of the leaves being acute to acuminate. The base of the leaf is narrowly cuneate and is decurrent on the stalk of the leaf. The entire leaf is glabrous and is generally darker on the upper face and paler on the other side.

The buds of Psidium galapageium are pear-shaped or "pyriform" and connected to the base of the branchlet, extending about  out. The bud is glabrous except for a minute hole at the apex with a few trichomes protruding  outward.

Flowers of Psidium galapageium are white, occur on branches of recent growth, and are relatively small, being  in diameter. Its berries are spherical in shape and are glabrous except for ripples created from glands in the berries. The berries are yellow when mature and turn black or a reddish-brown when dried.

Habitat and ecology

Psidium galapageium is formerly endemic to the Galápagos Islands, being found on the islands Fernandina, Isabella, Pinta, Santa Cruz, and Santiago, but has since spread to other tropical areas. It now occurs from central Mexico and Florida to Paraguay and central Brazil, as well as it was introduced widely in tropical Africa and locally in India. It typically grows in arid lowlands and moist uplands.

Uses

The berries of Psidium galapageium are edible, reportedly with a slight taste of turpentine, and geese are reported to frequently consume the berries. The wood of the tree is used locally in the Galápagos Islands as fencing or a building material, but is not very hardy nor enduring.

References

galapageium